Cherchera is a genus of snout moths. It was described by Constantin Dumont in 1932, and contains the species Cherchera abatesella. It is found in the Canary Islands, Tunisia, Malta and the United Arab Emirates.

The larvae feed on Acacia tortilis. They first feed at the extremities of the twigs between the young shoots. Later, they construct a spun tube following the bends of the twigs.  Full-grown larvae are grey-brown with a reddish tinge and with a white subdorsal and lateral line and reach a length of 20–25 mm.

References

Phycitinae
Monotypic moth genera
Moths of Europe
Moths of Africa
Moths of Asia